Moira L. Steyn-Ross is a New Zealand physics academic. She is currently a full professor at the University of Waikato.

Academic career

After a 1981 PhD titled  'The quantum theory of optical bistability in nonlinear systems'  at the University of Waikato, she joined staff, rising to full professor. Much of Steyn-Ross's research has been into the effect of anaesthesia.

References

Living people
New Zealand women academics
Academic staff of the University of Waikato
University of Waikato alumni
Year of birth missing (living people)
New Zealand physicists
Women physicists